Denis Bajramović (born 1961), is a Croatian basketball coach and former player.

Coaching career 
Bajramović coached Dubrovnik, Konavle Cavtat, Šibenik, Zagreb, Slovenian team Union Olimpija.

On September 13, 2017, Bajramović became a head coach for Golden Eagle Ylli of the Kosovo Superleague.

On March 20, 2018, Bajramović was hired to be the head coach of the Bosna Royal.

National team 
Bajramović was an assistant coach of Aleksandar Petrović with the Bosnia and Herzegovina national team at the EuroBasket 2013.

References

External links
 Coach Profile at eurobasket.com
 Bajramović ABA League Profile

1961 births
Living people
Bosniaks of Croatia
Croatian basketball coaches
Croatian men's basketball players
Expatriate basketball people in Kosovo
KK Bosna Royal coaches
KK Olimpija coaches
KK Šibenik coaches
Basketball players from Dubrovnik